Love & Hate is the fourth studio album by Blackpool band Section 25, released in 1988. 

Despite being recorded and finished by 1986, Factory Records didn't release the album until 1988, by which time the band was virtually forgotten. The factory also mishandled the launch of the album's first single (quoting from the Section 25 biography):

 The single (FAC 157) did not appear until May 1987 and was marred by a further disaster. Priming a joke that misfired badly, Factory's publicists informed trade paper Music Week that the new SXXV single was a cover of a 1965 hit - "Good News Week" - by industry pundit Jonathan King. King's publishers Jonjo wasted no time in claiming that the Section 25 composition was an unauthorized pastiche of the earlier song and that the first five lines of the lyrics infringed the copyright. The dispute was swiftly settled by the MCPS, but not before all copies of FAC 157 had been recalled by the distributor, and Section 25 was obliged to sign over 100% of the publishing to Jonjo Music and Jonathan King. New Order slipped similarly two years later, having borrowed chunks of "Leaving on a Jet Plane" by John Denver for their song "Run...". Truth is indeed often stranger than fiction.

Angered by Factory for numerous reasons, the band included '17 Alternative Titles' on the album's sleeve (however, there are only 14).

LTM Recordings reissued the album in 1999 with several bonus tracks. It was also renamed Love & Hate (In the English Countryside), but the album is still referred to by its original issue name. The whole package came with extensive liner notes and was digitally remastered. The sequencing of the album was altered to better flow with the new tracks, and "Tim Lick My Knees" was retitled to "Gymnopedies". A further re-issue appeared in 2013 on Factory Benelux, returning the track listing to the original 1988 running order with bonuses.

Track listing

1988 UK Factory release
"Sweet Forgiveness" – 6:39
"Conquer Me" – 6:00
"Sprinkling Petals into Hell" – 4:30
"The Last Man in Europe" – 3:12
"Bad News Week" – 5:28
"Tim Lick My Knees" – 2:33
"Shit Creek No Paddle" – 4:44
"Warhead" – 5:08
"Carcrash" – 3:42

'17 Alternative Titles'
"It'll be ready in two weeks"
"Dance if you can"
"Woodentops go apeshit"
"I'll ring you back"
"Speyn"
"Have you got a problem you want me to iron out"
"Rhythm Chief"
"Spiritual Criminal fights back in Love dilemma"
"Infatuation"
"With sex on their minds....."
"J'accuse"
"I'll let you know"
"Clever Dick"
"Young urban proletariat"

1999 LTM reissue
"Sweet Forgiveness" – 6:39
"Bad News Week" – 5:28
"Crazy Wisdom" – 4:33
"The Guitar Waltz" – 3:00
"Sprinkling Petals into Hell" – 4:30
"Warhead" – 5:08
"Gymnopedies" – 2:33
"Shit Creek No Paddle" – 4:44
"Conquer Me" – 6:00
"The Last Man in Europe" – 3:12
"Carcrash" – 3:42
"Bad News Week" (12 inch mix) – 4:54
"Crazy Wisdom" (Demo) – 5:07
"The Guitar Waltz" (Demo) – 3:04
"The Last Man in Europe" (Demo) – 3:27
"Carcrash" (Demo) – 2:09
"Just to Be with You" (Demo) – 3:53

2013 Factory Benelux reissue (FBN-45-CD)

"Sweet Forgiveness" – 6:39
"Conquer Me" – 6:00
"Sprinkling Petals into Hell" – 4:30
"The Last Man in Europe" – 3:12
"Bad News Week" – 5:28
"Tim Lick My Knees" – 2:33
"Shit Creek No Paddle" – 4:44
"Warhead" – 5:08
"Carcrash" – 3:42
"Crazy Wisdom" - 4.33
"The Guitar Waltz" - 3.00
"Bad News Week" (12 inch mix) – 4:54
"Bad News Week" (Cough mix) - 7:39
"Warhead" (Retro mix) - 5.08
"Crazy Wisdom" (demo) - 5.07
"Boogie Beat" (Bad News Week version) (Retro mix) - 3.28

References

External links
Section 25 Biography
Factory Benelux

1988 albums
Section 25 albums
Factory Records albums